Jan Hörl (born 16 October 1998) is an Austrian ski jumper and Olympic champion from the 2022 Winter Olympics in Beijing

Hörl's FIS Ski Jumping World Cup debut took place in Innsbruck on January 4th 2019 where he finished 29th.
On 5 December 2021 he won his first individual World Cup competition in Wisła, Poland.
On February 14, 2022, he achieved his biggest success when Jan Hörl, together with Stefan Kraft, Daniel Huber and Manuel Fettner, won the team competition gold medal in Beijing 2022.

World Cup
His best season has been the 2021-22 FIS Ski Jumping World Cup, where he finished 9th in the overall ranking with 662 points and achieved his first individual World Cup win in Wisła and finished 3rd on the Paul-Außerleitner-Schanze in his hometown Bischofshofen.
Hörl has won three team competitions this season in Wisła, Bischofshofen and Lahti. He also finished first in the large hill team competition in Beijing.

Individual victories

Team victories

Season standings

References

External links

1998 births
Living people
Austrian male ski jumpers
FIS Nordic World Ski Championships medalists in ski jumping
Ski jumpers at the 2022 Winter Olympics
Olympic ski jumpers of Austria
Olympic gold medalists for Austria
Olympic medalists in ski jumping
Medalists at the 2022 Winter Olympics
21st-century Austrian people